The Maa Borei Temple of the Goddess Borei is situated beside the Vaitaraṇi river, in a Kuturia village in the Jajpur district in the Indian state of Odisha.

The temple grounds are regarded as the cultural center of Kuturia, apart from general festivals connected with religious faiths observed throughout Hindu religion. Specific festivals are celebrated in the precincts of the temple throughout the year.

A fair takes place each year in the month of February to March. Various cultural programs are performed. Baisakh Sankranti is another important festival.

Hindu temples in Jajpur district